Senecio kleiniiformis is a species of flowering plant in the genus Senecio and family Asteraceae. It was previously considered to be in the genus Kleinia. This species is thought to be found only in cultivation. Its leaves are blue-green and triangular shaped. Its pale yellow blooms attract butterflies at the end of summer and early fall. This species is drought tolerant and fire resistant, but it cannot survive frost.

References

External links

kleiniiformis